The Sigtuna rib (signum U NOR1998;25) is a 12th-century runic amulet found in the 1990s in Sigtuna, Uppland, Sweden

Description
The amulet is a rib bone with writing on both sides of it. The inscription appears to be a spell against disease.

Inscription

Scandinavian Runic-text Database
The Scandinavian Runic-text Database offers the following "standard" readings:

Transliteration:
§A iorils × ouriþ × uaksna ur : kroke × bat han × riþu × bar-…
§B han : riþu × aok × siþa × sarþ × sararan × uara × hafir × fult ¶ f(e)kit × fly : braot riþa

Old West Norse normalization
§A Jórils vrið!/óvrið vaksna ur Króki! Bant hann riðu, bar[ði](?)
§B hann riðu. Ok síða(?) sarð sára-rann. Vara hefir (hann) fullt fengit. Flý braut riða!

Runic Swedish normalization
§A Iōrils vrið!/ovrið vaksna uʀ Krōki! Bant hann riðu, bar[ði](?)
§B hann riðu. Ok sīða(?) sarð sāra-rann. Vara hafiʀ (hann) fullt fængit. Flȳ braut riða!

English translation
§A Jórill's woundcauser / Jórill's abnormal stomach-ache disappear from Krókr! He bound the fever, he fought(?)
§B the fever. And did away with the abscess. (He) has fully cought the pus. Flee away, fever!

References

See also
 Sigtuna amulet I
 Canterbury charm
 Kvinneby amulet

12th-century inscriptions
1990s archaeological discoveries
Archaeology of Sweden
Runic inscriptions
Historical runic magic
Norse paganism
Sources on Germanic paganism
Occult texts
Amulets